Gypsy (SP-55) was the planned designation for a motorboat the United States Navy acquired in 1917 for use as a patrol vessel but which was destroyed by a fire before she could be commissioned.

Gypsy was built in 1912 by George Lawley and Sons at Neponset, Massachusetts as a private motorboat. The U.S. Navy purchased Gypsy on 11 May 1917 for World War I service for $9,000 from Robert F. Herrick of Boston, who also owned Apache that was also purchased by the Navy on 23 May 1917 just before completion. The craft was intended to use her as a patrol boat in the Section Patrol. However, before she could be commissioned, she was completely destroyed by an accidental fire while fitting out, on 20 June 1917 off coast of the U.S. Coast Guard Station Allerton Point, south east of Boston, Massachusetts.

Gypsy was stricken from the Navy List on 23 November 1919.

List of patrol vessels of the United States Navy

References

NavSource Online: Section Patrol Craft Photo Archive: Gypsy (SP 55) 

Cancelled ships of the United States Navy
Patrol vessels of the United States Navy
World War I patrol vessels of the United States
Ships built in Boston
1912 ships
Maritime incidents in 1917
Ship fires